John Crawford may refer to:

Arts and entertainment
 John Crawford (sculptor) (1830–1861), Glasgow sculptor
 John McKinnon Crawford (1931–2005), Scottish painter and teacher
 John Crawford (actor) (1920–2010), American actor
 Johnny Crawford (1946–2021), American actor and musician
 John Crawford (musician) (born 1960), bassist in the band Berlin
 John Crawford, American cartoonist of the 1980s and 1990s for Flipside
 John Crawford (author), Iraq war veteran and author of The Last True Story I'll Ever Tell: An Accidental Soldier's Account of the War in Iraq
 JonFX, born John Alexander Crawford, Jamaican music producer

Politics
 John Crawford (Manitoba politician) (1856–1928), Manitoba politician
 John Crawford (Tennessee politician), member of the Tennessee House of Representatives
 John Crawford (Wisconsin politician) (1792–1881), American pioneer and politician from Milwaukee County
 John C. Crawford, Wisconsin state assemblyman from Green County
 John G. Crawford, member of the Georgia House of Representatives
 John L. Crawford, doctor and state legislator in Florida
 John Herbert Crawford (politician) (1843–1882), lawyer and political figure in New Brunswick, Canada
 John S. Crawford (1923–1979), Wisconsin state assemblyman from Wood County
 John Willoughby Crawford (1817–1875), Member of the Parliament of Canada

Sports
 John Crawford (cricketer) (1849–1935), English clergyman and cricketer
 John Crawford (footballer) (1880–1934), Scottish football half-back for Lincoln City and Nottingham Forest in the 1900s
 Jack Crawford (cricketer) (John Neville Crawford, 1886–1963), Surrey and South Australia cricketer
 Jack Crawford (tennis) (John Herbert Crawford, 1908–1991), Australian tennis player of the 1930s
 Jack Crawford (ice hockey) (John Shea Crawford, 1916–1973), Canadian ice hockey defenceman and coach

Other
 John Crawford (silversmith) (fl. 1815–1843), American silversmith
 John Martin Crawford (scholar) (1845–1916), U.S. physician, first translator of the Finnish Kalevala into English
 John W. Crawford (1846–?), American medical doctor and mayor of Lawrence, Massachusetts
 John Wallace Crawford (1847–1917), American Civil War veteran, American Old West scout, and poet of western lore
 John Wilson Crawford (1899–1943), Australian Army officer during World War II
 John Crawford (economist) (1910–1984), chancellor of the Australian National University
 John R. Crawford (1915–1976), contract bridge and backgammon player, known for the Crawford-rule
 John Martin Crawford (1962–2020), Canadian serial killer
 John Crawford III (1992–2014), African American man fatally shot by police
 John Crawford (engineer), American computer engineer who won the 1995 Eckert-Mauchly Award
 John David Crawford (1954–1998), professor at the University of Pittsburgh
 John Crawford (physician) (1746–1813), introducer of vaccination into America

See also
Jack Crawford (disambiguation)
John Crawfurd (1783–1868), Scottish colonial administrator
John Herbert Crawford (disambiguation)
Crawfordjohn, a village in Scotland